Middleboro is an unincorporated community in Warren County, in the U.S. state of Ohio.

History
Middleboro was platted in 1838. A variant name was "Middleborough".

References

Unincorporated communities in Warren County, Ohio